Christ Institute of Technology (CIT;  French: Institut de technologie du Christ) is an engineering college established in Pondicherry in India. The college was founded in 2009. The Institution is affiliated to Pondicherry University and is Approved by AICTE New Delhi

References

External links
Christ Institute of Technology official homepage

Universities and colleges in Pondicherry (city)
Engineering colleges in Puducherry